Abdulkadir Said Ahmed (born 17 July 1999) is a Somali footballer who plays as a midfielder for Finnish club VJS and the Somalia national team.

Club career
In 2017, Ahmed began his career with Palloseura Kemi Kings. Later that year, Ahmed signed for Kakkonen club KTP, making five appearances in the 2017 season. For the 2018 season, Ahmed joined PK Keski-Uusimaa, making eight league appearances for the club. Ahead of the 2019 season, Ahmed joined VJS.

International career
On 7 December 2019, Ahmed made his debut for Somalia in a 0–0 draw against Djibouti in the 2019 CECAFA Cup.

Personal life 
Abdulkadir Said Ahmed is the brother of the footballer Ahmed Said Ahmed and the politician Suldaan Said Ahmed.

He holds Finnish citizenship.

References

1999 births
Living people
Association football midfielders
Somalian footballers
Sportspeople from Mogadishu
Somalia international footballers
Somalian emigrants to Finland
Naturalized citizens of Finland
Finnish footballers
Finnish people of Somali descent
Kemi City F.C. players
Kakkonen players
Kotkan Työväen Palloilijat players
Pallokerho Keski-Uusimaa players